Cosseria is a comune (municipality) in the Province of Savona in the Italian region Liguria, located about  west of Genoa and about  northwest of Savona.

Cosseria borders the following municipalities: Cairo Montenotte, Carcare, Cengio, Millesimo, and Plodio. The 5th Infantry Division Cosseria took its name from the town.

References

External links
 Official website

Cities and towns in Liguria